Kula World (Roll Away in North America and  in Japan) is a 3D platform puzzle video game developed by Game Design Sweden AB for the Sony PlayStation, which places the player in control of a Kula beach ball. The main objective of the game is to collect keys which unlock the level exits, as well as coins and jewels along the way. The game makes use of alternative physics, changing the direction of gravity as the ball moves.

Gameplay
Various elements and obstacles are introduced as one moves on to new levels, which means that the complexity and level of puzzle solving required gradually increases as the game progresses. The game involves making ingenious use of the various types of platforms and surrounding objects, from moving platforms and transporters to bouncing platforms and jumping pills.

Bonus levels can be unlocked by gathering five fruits (one available in each stage). If one enters a bonus level, the word "BONUS" appears. Completing the bonus stage requires one to 'activate' all the cubes on all platforms by rolling over them. The bonus stages also become more complex as the game progresses.

Points are awarded when the player collects keys, treasures, and fruits and also when they complete levels. Points are deducted if the Kula ball is spiked, captured, melted, burnt by a laser, falls/slides off or simply runs out of time, all of which require the player to restart the level - providing the score has not fallen below zero, in which case, the game ends.

A two-player mode is available, with two variations of the game. A time trial and a version called "copycat". In the time trial the players take turns to determine who can complete each stage in the quickest time possible. The "copycat" version is a kind of memory tester. It involves one player starting off making two moves, and the next player then copies those moves and adds two of their own. The first player then has to copy all of the moves so far and add two more moves at the end. This continues until one of the players makes a mistake, after which the opponent is awarded a point. A move constitutes either changing direction, moving forward or jumping (either on the spot/forwards or onto another platform).

Reception

Kula World received generally positive reviews from video game publications. Edge praised the game for gradually introducing new challenges as the player advances through the stages, comparing the game's progression to a "good Nintendo title". However, the magazine criticized the game's lack of replay value and the multiplayer mode for not offering  split screen gameplay. GamePro said of the game's import, "Sadly, you'll always play the same worlds in the same order, which greatly hinders replayability, so consider this one a rental or a trade-in." In Japan, Famitsu gave it a score of 29 out of 40.

The game was nominated for the "Best Puzzle Game" award at the 1998 OPM Editors' Awards, which went to Devil Dice.

Notes

References

External links
 

1998 video games
Android (operating system) games
Marble games
PlayStation (console) games
Psygnosis games
Puzzle video games
Sony Interactive Entertainment games
Video games developed in Sweden
Multiplayer and single-player video games